The GWR 101 Class consisted of a single experimental 0-4-0T side-tank steam locomotive. It was built at GWR Swindon Works under the direction of George Jackson Churchward in June 1902.

Originally built as an oil-burning locomotive 'on Holden's system', it had an unusual boiler containing a firebox constructed as an arched chamber made from fire-bricks, opening to the firetubes in front, and with two oil-burning nozzles at the back. Over this was mounted a short saddle tank for the oil fuel.

As soon as July 1902, it was redesigned with a smaller firebox and a single burner. It was given a Lentz boiler with a cylindrical corrugated firebox inside the barrel in 1903. The saddle tank for fuel was removed and oil stored at the rear end of the side tanks. In 1905, the locomotive was rebuilt as a coal burner, with the cab backplate replaced by a bunker.

It was intended for light passenger service on the Wrington Vale Light Railway near Bristol. However, due to technical issues associated with the design, the locomotive never saw the intended service. It remained at Swindon Works, used as a works shunter. No further engines were built to this design, and the locomotive was withdrawn and scrapped in 1911.

Despite it being a unique, obscure and short-lived experimental loco, Hornby have been producing a 00 scale model of No. 101 since 1978, in many prototypical and non-prototypical guises. It is currently sold as part of the Railroad range. Hornby inaccurately ascribe the whole design to Holden, instead of just the oil-burning mechanism.

See also
 GWR oil-burning locomotives 1946–1949
 Oil burner (engine)

Notes

References
 
 
 
 

101
Shunting locomotives
0-4-0T locomotives 
Experimental locomotives 
Scrapped locomotives
Unique locomotives 
Railway locomotives introduced in 1902